is a series of racing games created by Yutaka Kaminaga at Media Rings, which started in 1991 with the PC Engine title Zero4 Champ.

The series would transfer to the Kaminaga-founded WorkJam with the PlayStation 2 title Zero4 Champ Series: Drift Champ, codeveloped by Tamsoft and published by Hudson Soft, along with the mobile phone Go! Zero4 Champ developed by Profire, both of which were released in late 2002.

Conception
In Japan, street racing sometimes occurs on long straights in industrial areas, which are used for drag races.

Japanese drag racing is noted for its flair, featuring various sport-grade Japanese cars such as the Toyota MR2-GT (SW20), Mazda RX-7 Type RS (FD3S), Mitsubishi Lancer Evolution VI (CP9A), Subaru Impreza WRX STi (GDB), the Nissan Skyline GT-R V-Spec (BNR34), and Honda NSX Type-S Zero (NA2), all import scene classics.

Summary
The series is something of a predecessor to works like Initial D and Wangan Midnight, with its touge racing, aero parts tuning, and anime-style "Story Mode". It has also RPG and simulation gameplay which was succeeded by the Shutokou Battle titles Kattobi Tune and Racing Battle C1 Grand Prix.

History
 1991.03.08: Zero4 Champ (ゼロヨンチャンプ), PC Engine
 1993.05.03: Zero4 Champ II (ゼロヨンチャンプII), PC Engine Super CD-ROM²
 1994.07.22: Zero4 Champ RR (ゼロヨンチャンプ ダブルアール), Super Famicom
 1995.11.25: Zero4 Champ RR-Z (ゼロヨンチャンプ ダブルアール・ヅィー), Super Famicom
 1997.06.20: Zero4 Champ DooZy-J (ゼロヨンチャンプ ドゥーヅィージェイ), PlayStation / Sega Saturn (subtitled Type-R / タイプアール for the latter console)
 2002.11.21: Zero4 Champ Series: Drift Champ (ゼロヨンチャンプ シリーズ ドリフトチャンプ), PlayStation 2 (Hudson Soft)
 2002.12.24: Go! Zero4 Champ (GO!04チャンプ), Mobile phone i-mode 504i (Hudson Soft / Profire)

Zero4 Extreme
In June 2005, a fan-made flash game Zero4 Extreme (ゼロヨンエクストリーム) was released by Kuruma, though it is currently a dead link.

Notes

See also
Initial D
Wangan Midnight
Shutokou Battle series

External links
Drift Champ official website
Go! Zero4 Champ official website (Profire)
Go! Zero4 Champ official website (Hudson Soft)
Go! Zero4 Champ press release
Zero4 Champ series overview & Yutaka Kaminaga profile

1991 video games
1992 video games
1993 video games
1994 video games
1995 video games
1997 video games
2002 video games
Japan-exclusive video games
PlayStation (console) games
PlayStation 2 games
Racing video games
Sega Saturn games
Super Nintendo Entertainment System games
TurboGrafx-16 games
TurboGrafx-16-only games
TurboGrafx-CD games
TurboGrafx-CD-only games
Video game franchises
Video game franchises introduced in 1991